William Kendall (April 1, 1910 — April 18, 1996) was a Canadian professional ice hockey player.

Career 
Kendall played for several teams in the minor leagues including the St. Louis Flyers and the London Tecumsehs. He played in the NHL for the Chicago Black Hawks and the Toronto Maple Leafs from 1934 to 1938 and won the Stanley Cup with Chicago in 1934.

From 1942–1944, he served with the Canadian Army during World War II. After the war, Kendall returned to hockey and played two seasons before retiring in 1946.

Career statistics

Regular season and playoffs

Awards and achievements
Stanley Cup Championship (1934)
AHA Championships (1938, 1939, & 1941)
AHA Second All-Star Team (1940)
Honoured Member of the Manitoba Hockey Hall of Fame

External links

1910 births
1996 deaths
Canadian ice hockey right wingers
Canadian military personnel of World War II
Chicago Blackhawks players
Duluth Hornets players
Elmwood Maple Leafs players
Elmwood Millionaires players
Ice hockey people from Winnipeg
St. Louis Flyers players
St. Louis Flyers (AHA) players
Stanley Cup champions
Toronto Maple Leafs players
Canadian expatriate ice hockey players in the United States